This article lists events from the year 1972 in Peru.

Incumbents
 President: Fernando Belaúnde Terry 
 Vice President of Peru: Luis Edgardo Mercado Jarrín
 Prime Minister: Ernesto Montagne Sánchez

Events
12 April – Carmen Amelia Ampuero is selected as Miss Peru Universe 1972.
At the 1972 Summer Olympics in Munich, West Germany, Peru is represented in seven sports, by 20 competitors, 17 men and 3 women.

Publications

Cinema 

Cholo, starring football player Hugo Sotil

Sport 
1972 Copa Perú

Births
 18 March – Mario Rodríguez, footballer 
 6 December – Mónica Santa María, model and TV hostess (died 1994)

Deaths
 12 March – César Atahualpa Rodríguez, poet (born 1889)

References

External links

 
1970s in Peru
Years of the 20th century in Peru
Peru
Peru